Stefan Stanchev (born 26 April 1989) is a Bulgarian professional footballer who plays as a defender for Rodopa Smolyan.

Career

Levski Sofia

Stanchev comes directly from Levski Sofia's youth academy. After the establishment of the second team of Levski, he became a part of the new-formed PFC Levski Sofia B. During the first season of the Doubles League, Levski became a champion.

Stanchev made his official debut for Levski's senior team at 13 June 2009 in a match against Pirin Blagoevgrad. The result of the match was 1:1 with a guest draw for Levski.

On 7 January 2010, Stanchev started training with Levski again. On 20 March 2010, he was in the starting line-up for Levski and played the full 90 minutes, earning praise for his performance in the 3:0 home win against Slavia Sofia. On 27 March 2010, he played in his first Eternal Derby against CSKA Sofia, but was withdrawn in the 39th minute after sustaining an injury.

Pirin loan
On 2 August 2009, Stanchev was loaned out for one year to Pirin Blagoevgrad together with his team-mate Ivan Tsachev. However, after half a season, Stanchev returned to Levski. For Pirin he earned 10 appearances, playing in the A PFG.

Botev Plovdiv
On 28 June 2012, he signed a contract with Botev Plovdiv for 1+1 years.
His first appearance in an official match came on 11 August 2012, in the 3:0 home win over Slavia Sofia. Stanchev had difficulties securing a starting spot for himself. In January he was released.

Cherno More Varna
On 5 June 2013, Stanchev signed with Cherno More Varna.

Career Stats

Honours

Club
Levski Sofia
 Bulgarian A Group: 2008–09

Cherno More
 Bulgarian Cup: 2014–15
 Bulgarian Supercup: 2015

References

External links
 Stanchev at Levski's site
 

1989 births
Living people
People from Smolyan
Bulgarian footballers
Association football defenders
PFC Levski Sofia players
PFC Pirin Blagoevgrad players
Botev Plovdiv players
PFC Minyor Pernik players
PFC Cherno More Varna players
First Professional Football League (Bulgaria) players